Stray Dog West is an island in Greenland. It is a candidate for the northernmost island on Earth.

History 
Stray Dog West was discovered during a 2007 expedition led by Dennis Schmitt. The island is four meters above sea level, making it likely that rising oceans will eventually permanently submerge the island. The island was made of sediment with gravel, mud and boulders. It was estimated in 2007 that the island had a landmass of 100 x 60m.

Territorial disputes 
In 2007, Denmark sent an icebreaker to the surrounding area in order to find data to attempt an extension of its maritime territory. Russia disagreed with Denmark's proposal and claimed that the ridge underneath the ocean came from Russia, making the Stray Dog West and other disputed islands Russian territory. It is also disputed over whether Stray Dog West counts as an island, as it is submerged at high tide.

See also 

 Kaffeklubben Island
 Northernmost point of land

References

Uninhabited islands of Greenland